Ratschiller is a surname. Notable people with the surname include:

Andreas Ratschiller (born 1983), Austrian ice hockey player
Ludwig-Karl Ratschiller (1921–2004), Italian anti-Nazi partisan
Marco Ratschiller, Editor in Chief of Nebelspalter
Tobias Ratschiller, founder of the software company Maguma and original author of phpMyAdmin